Sutton Mallet Church in the village of Sutton Mallet, which is within the parish of Stawell, Somerset, England, was built in 1827 incorporating elements of a 15th-century church on the site. It is recorded in the National Heritage List for England as a designated Grade II listed building.

The village is on Sedgemoor on the Somerset Levels, at the foot of the Polden Hills. The old church which dated from the mediaeval period provided a landmark for anyone crossing the moor. Deterioration of the fabric of the church had  was reported in the 16th and 17th centuries and services were only held infrequently in the 18th and 19th.

The current church was built between 1827 and 1829 by Richard Carver of Taunton adjoining the old tower. Although the rebuilding was in a Georgian style remnants from the earlier church were reused including a mediaeval window which was incorporated into the small apse, and the 17th-century altar rails were reused.

The Gothic tower includes two 17th-century bells, one from 1607 by R. Purdue and another of 1657 by Robert Austen.

The church is now a redundant church in the care of the Churches Conservation Trust.  It was vested in the Trust on 1 November 1987.

See also
 List of churches preserved by the Churches Conservation Trust in South West England

References

Church of England church buildings in Sedgemoor
Grade II listed churches in Somerset
Grade II listed buildings in Sedgemoor
Churches preserved by the Churches Conservation Trust
Former churches in Somerset